The SEABA Championship is a basketball tournament national teams organized by the Southeast Asia Basketball Association, a sub-zone of the FIBA Asia. It serves as a qualifier for the FIBA Asia Cup.

Summary

Medal table

Performance by teams 
Teams that qualified to the FIBA Asia Championship are in boldface.

 National basketball federation qualified, but later was suspended.
 National basketball federation was suspended.
 National basketball federation was host of the FIBA Asia Championship.

External links

 
Basketball competitions in Asia between national teams
1994 establishments in Southeast Asia
Recurring sporting events established in 1994
Biennial sporting events